Kim Chwa-jin or Kim Jwa-jin (December 16, 1889 – January 24, 1930), sometimes called by his pen name Baegya, was a Korean general, independence activist, and anarchist who played an important role in the early attempts at development of anarchism in Korea.

Biography 
Kim was born in Hongseong County, Chungcheong Province on December 16, 1889 as the second son of Kim Hyeong-gyo. He was part of a wealthy family of the Andong Kim lineage. Kim was described as a broad-minded and intelligent child. When he was 3 years old, his father died, and he grew up under strict education by his mother, Hansan Yi. In 1904, he married Oh Sook-geun. Kim Chwa-chin moved to Seoul in 1905 in order to attend an Army Military Academy, later establishing the Namyeon School in 1907, where modern academic disciplines were taught.

When Kim was 18, he released 50 families of slaves when he publicly burned the slave registry and provided each family with enough land to live on. This was the first emancipation of slaves in modern Korea.

Kim also organized branches of the Korea Association and the Association for the Performing Arts in Hongseong to spread the ideology of Korean national liberation. In 1909, he served as a director of the Hansung-Sik Company. He established a northwestern academic institution with An and Yi Kap, and established the Oh Sung-sung School as its affiliated educational institution to serve as vice president. He also helped establish a youth student association.

In 1911, he visited Jokdol Kim Jong-geun in Donui-dong, a fund-raising institution, to establish the Independence Military Academy in northern Gando. However, he ended up being sent to Seodaemun Prison for two years and six months, for his subversive activities. During his sentence, he encountered Kim Gu. After his release from prison in 1913, he wrote a poem, "If a man makes a mistake, it is difficult to tolerate, and if the governor tries to live, he must wait again." In 1916, Kim joined the Korea Liberation Corps, which was formed by Park Sang-jin and Chae Ki-joong, together with Nobalin and Shin Hyun-dae. In 1918, he fled to Manchuria to escape the Japanese rule of Korea, and there signed the Korean Declaration of Independence together with 39 other Korean representatives, a prelude to the March 1st Independence Movement.

He joined the Korea Justice Corps, which focused on Senol, took military responsibility, reorganized the definition group into the military department, and was recommended as the commander. In 1919, he, on the recommendation of the Provisional Government of the Republic of Korea, took up the position of general commander of the Northern Military Administration Office Army (Bungnogunjeongseo in Korean). His first action was to install a military center in the mountains of Wangqing County, where he himself became an educator on military leadership. Training under him was strict, and the tasks given to most of the troops under his command was focused on acquiring weapons. In September 1920, 298 people graduated from the First Military Academy.

When the Japanese military unit was sent to Manchuria in October to eliminate the Korean independence forces, it met with Japanese troops in Cheongsan-ri, while moving its independence forces to Mount Baekdu. On October 21, the Battle of Cheongsanri took place after the Battle of Godonghae, starting with Baegun-ri, Baegung, on October 26. In particular, the Northern Korean military regime led by General Kim Chwa-chin contributed greatly to the victory in Cheongsanri by winning a great victory in the Battle of Baegun Pyeongjoon, Gonjeongjeon, and Eorang Village. This victory, where Kim's forces caused around 1200 casualties to the 3000 Japanese soldiers, was a landmark in the battle for independence.

Later that year, he went with the Northern Korean army and arrived at the North Manju Milsan Mountain near Russia. About 10 groups of independence fighters united and took office as vice president of the Korean Liberation Army. When many people moved to northern Russia on a silver lining to support the independence of small ethnic groups, Kim crossed the red river.

But it had thought that he returned to Manchuria to reunite and wait for the scattered comrades, and in March 1925, he founded Sinminbu and became vice chairman of the military and commander of the army. In addition, a school was established as the first place to teach and train elite military officers. At that time, the Provisional Government of the Republic of Korea appointed him as a member of the Cabinet. Kim did not take office and instead concentrated only on leading the independence forces.

When many officials were captured by the Japanese government in 1927, the new administration was reorganized to lead the new administration as chairman of the Central Committee of the Commission.

In 1928, the Korea Independence Party was formed, and in 1929, when the Korean General Association was established as the successor of the new people, Chwa-chin was designated as the President. During this process, conflicts between the nationalist and communist independence activists intensified. On January 24, 1930, Kim Jwa-jin was assassinated by Park Sang-sil, an agent of the Japanese colonial government. Just before he died, Kim Jwa-jin said, “What to do… I have to die at this time with so much work to do. How regrettable...” Three years after his death, his wife, Oh Sook-geun, recovered his remains and buried them in Hongseong, his hometown.

Acts 
Kim Chwa-chin had recognized and fought against Japanese imperialism from an early stage. In 1919 Kim established the Northern military administration office army (북로군정서군, 北路軍政署軍). General Kim leads the Korean Independence Army in the Battle of Cheongsanri.

Afterward General Kim was appointed as the chairman of an executive committee at the age of 38 and attempted to integrate the Independence Movement groups in China and Manchuria. When anarchist and nationalist groups founded a rebel community in Manchuria in the province of Shinmin in 1929, Kim Chwa-chin was chosen to lead its armed forces. He was charged with organizing and leading guerrilla attacks on the Japanese. Though the Japanese soldiers were far more experienced and better armed than Chwa-chin's band, Kim's attacks were successful both in defending the young anarchist community of Shinmin, and in encouraging other groups in northeast Asia to resist the occupiers.

Kim was assassinated in 1930 while repairing a rice mill the Korean Anarchist Federation had built in Shinmin. Although his assassin was never found, the assassin's handler was caught and executed.

Shinmin after Kim Chwa-chin 
After the assassination of Kim Chwa-chin, the anarchist movement in Manchukuo and Korea became subject to massive repression. Japan sent armies to attack Shinmin from the south, while pro-Kuomintang forces attacked from the north. By the summer of 1931, Shinmin's most prominent anarchists were dead, and the war on two fronts was becoming untenable. The anarchists went underground and anarchist Shinmin was no more.

As a leader of the Korean independence movement, Kim is remembered in both North and South Korea. In 1991, the town of Hongseong restored his birthplace. A festival is now held in his honor every October.

Family 
Father - Kim Hyeong-gyu (김형규, 金衡圭)
 Grandfather - Kim Byeong-jo (김병호, 金炳皓)
 Mother - Yi Sang-hee (이상희), Lady Yi of the Hansan Yi clan (한산 이씨)
 Siblings
 Older brother - Kim Gyeong-jin (김경진, 金敬鎭)
 Older sister - Kim Ok-chul (김옥출)
 Younger brother - Kim Dong-jin (김동진, 金東鎭) (29 November 1891 - 13 March 1938)
First Wife - Oh Suk-geun (오숙근, 吳淑根), Lady Oh of the Haeju Oh clan (해주 오씨, 海州 吳氏) (1887 - 1958) — No issue.
Second Wife - Kim Gye-wol (김계월) — No issue.
 Third Wife - Na Hye-guk (나혜국, 羅惠國) (1901 - 28 November 1992)
 Daughter - Kim Seok-chul (김석출) (28 February 1922 - 26 July 2005)
 Son - Kim Cheol-han (김철한)
 Grandson - Kim Won-dong (김원동)
 Fourth Wife - Kim Yeong-seok (김영석)
 Son - Kim Du-han
 Daughter-in-law - Yi Jae-hee (이재희, 李載熙) (1924 - 4 August 1986)
Granddaughter - Kim Eul-dong
 Grandson-in-law - Song Jeong-eung (송정웅, 宋政雄) (2 September 1945 - )
Great-grandson - Song Il-gook
 Great-granddaughter - Song Song-yi (송송이) (17 May 1973 - )
 Grandson - Kim Hyeon-dong (김현동)
 Daughter-in-law - Kim Bu-mi (김부미, 金富美) (1917 - 1999)
 Granddaughter - Kim Yeong-chae (김영채)
 Grandson - Kim Gyeong-dong (김경동) or Kim Gyeong-min (김경민, 金慶珉) (1955 - )
 Grandson - Kim Hyeon-seong (김현성)
 Daughter-in-law - Kim Sun-ok (김순옥, 金順玉) (1945 - ?)
 Grandson - Kim Beom-sang (김범상)
 Daughter-in-law - Park Jeong-in (박정인, 朴貞仁) (1933 - ?)
 Grandson - Kim Ju-taek (김주택)
 Daughter - Kim Kang-seok (김강석)

In popular culture 
 Kim was portrayed by Choi Dong-joon in the 2002-2003 SBS TV series Rustic Period.

See also 
 Korean independence movement

References

Bibliography

External links
Profile by the Hongseong County government
  Kim Jwa-jin Memorial League
  KoreanDB profile

1889 births
1930 deaths
Anarchist partisans
Anarcho-communists
Andong Kim clan
Guerrillas
People imprisoned on charges of terrorism
Korean anarchists
Korean generals
Korean independence activists
Murdered anarchists
People from Hongseong County
Imperial Korean Army Cadets